Gilson Peak is a summit in the U.S. state of Nevada.

Gilson Peak was named after the Gilson brothers, early settlers to the area. A variant name is "Gilsons Peak".

References

Mountains of Eureka County, Nevada
Mountains of White Pine County, Nevada